Mimusops acutifolia is a species of plant in the family Sapotaceae. It is endemic to Tanzania.

References

Flora of Tanzania
acutifolia
Vulnerable plants
Taxonomy articles created by Polbot